Provincial Road 307 (PR 307) is a provincial road in the eastern part of the Canadian province of Manitoba.  It is part of the La Vérendrye Trail in eastern Manitoba and lies mostly within Whiteshell Provincial Park.

Route description
It then winds through the west-central region of the park before ending at PTH 44 near Rennie.

The western part of PR 307 provides access to the Seven Sisters Falls Generating Station and Whitemouth Falls Provincial Park.  Within the Whiteshell, PR 307 provides access to numerous lakes and cottage areas, including Brereton Lake, Dorothy Lake, Nutamik Lake, Betula Lake, White Lake, Otter Falls, and Red Rock Lake. Big Whiteshell Lake can be reached from PR 307 via PR 309.

References

External links 
Official Highway Map of Manitoba - Eastern

307